Walter Frank Perkins (1865 - 1946) was a Conservative MP.

He won New Forest from the Liberals in January 1910, and was returned unopposed in December 1910.

He was returned unopposed for the new New Forest and Christchurch in 1918, but stood down in 1922.

Sources
Craig, F.W.S. British parliamentary election results 1885–1918
Craig, F.W.S. British parliamentary election results 1918–1949
Whitaker's Almanack, 1911 to 1922 editions

Conservative Party (UK) MPs for English constituencies
Politics of Hampshire
1865 births
1946 deaths